Kalantari is a surname. Notable people with the surname include:

Ali Kalantari (born 1968), Iranian footballer and coach
Ayoub Kalantari (born 1990), Iranian footballer
Isa Kalantari (born 1952), Iranian politician, brother of Mousa
Mousa Kalantari (1949–1981), Iranian politician